Janika Fabrikant, (born 1934) is a French-Swiss painter of urban and industrial landscapes, who was born in Paris, France. She lives in Zürich, where her painting is prominent because of its special characteristic of  cognitive dissonance. Her style, based on Surrealism, expresses a marked discrepancy between visual reality and terror.

Career 
From 1953-1955 Fabrikant studied painting  at the Académie de la Grande Chaumière. In 1961 she  moved to Zurich, where she enrolled at the  Zurich University of the Arts and studied painting from 1982-1985.

Her artistic development was inspired by visits to the U.S.A. where she felt a closer affinity to the contemporary art movements compared  to Picasso and the Parisian avant garde, with which she had grown up. She was strongly influenced by Edward Hopper and  Milton Avery. In Detroit Fabrikant discovered her theme  which she rendered in her characteristic synthetic colours, removed from nature. In 2013, one of her installations, The Butterfly, was selected as a finalist in the Waste•smART creative competition, run by the European Environment Agency.

Style 
To reach out to Fabrikant's visual language some critics have attempted to categorize her style as “Visionary Precisionism” or “Expressive Objectivity” But her work is more complex. Although her paintings certainly have an element of American Precisionism, her irony, her sense of paradox, the monumentalization of the banal shows Fabrikant's roots in  Pop art.

Since 1987 Fabrikant has participated in group exhibitions in Switzerland, France, the U.S.A. and one in China. Her work was selected to be showcased at the Exhibition 93, Union des Femmes peintres, sculpteurs, graveurs, decorateurs UFPS “Les Contemporaines” at the Grand Palais, in Paris (1993), and she was profiled by World's Women On-Line. Her work was  presented at the Fourth United Nation's World Conference on Women in Beijing, China (1995), organized by artist Muriel Magenta at Arizona State University, Tempe, U.S.A. One of her paintings was selected for the electronic Space Art archive stored at the MIR Space Station, as a result of her participation in the Ars ad Astra Exhibit, organized by the OURS Foundation.

Fabrikant's first solo exhibition was held in 1987. In total she has had 12 solo exhibitions, mainly in Paris and Zurich. Her work is not only in private collections, but several paintings were  acquired by the Bollag Galleries.  Since 2010 she is represented by the Galerie Alex Schlesinger in Zurich.

References 

 ANGELI, Bruno. Zwischen Pinsel und Pedalen. (Between paintbrush and pedals: The theme of the bicycle in Janika Fabrikant's painting). Velojournal 3, Zurich, 2011: 61.
 ANONYMOUS  under “Diese Woche”. Unbestechliche Wahrnehmung (Incorruptible perception). Tachles, (Weekly Newspaper) Zurich,  27 April 2007.
 BEN YOSEF, Ute. Menschlich fabrizierte Maschinenlandschaften. J. Rundschau Maccabi, (Weekly Newspaper)  Basle (Switzerland), 21 November 1991.
 BEN YOSEF, Ute. Janika Fabrikant stellt in Paris aus.  J. Rundschau Maccabi, Basel, 17 September 1992.
 BEN YOSEF, Ute. Janika Fabrikant: Schoene Neue Welt und Kognitive Dissonanz. Zurich, Galerie Alex Schlesinger 2014.  .
 BERG, Vivianne. Fabriken in Farben, die sich beissen (Factories in clashing colours). I. Wochenblatt (Weekly Newspaper)  48, Zurich, 1 December 1995.
 ROSENBERG, Gabi. Schönheit als Sinnbild des Bösen (Beauty as symbol of evil). J. Rundschau Maccabi, (Weekly Newspaper) Basle, 4 January 1996.

External links 
 Clara database of women artist, Library and Research Center of the National Museum of Women in the Arts, Washington DC.
 european-art.net database, Zurich.
 Janika Fabrikant at the Bollag Galleries 2008-2010, Zurich, Switzerland. 
 SIKART Lexicon on art in Switzerland, Swiss Institute for Art Research.
 VISARTE.SWITZERLAND, visual arts association - Switzerland, formerly GSMBA (Society for Swiss painters, sculptors and architects).
 Janika Fabrikant at the Gallery Alex Schlesinger since 2010 in Zurich, Switzerland.

1934 births
Living people
20th-century Swiss women artists
21st-century Swiss women artists
Painters from Paris
Swiss surrealist artists
French surrealist artists
Swiss painters
20th-century French painters
Swiss people of French descent
Swiss women painters
French women painters
Women surrealist artists
Swiss contemporary artists
21st-century French painters
20th-century French women
21st-century French women